Euspondylus is a genus of lizards in the family Gymnophthalmidae.

Geographic range
The genus Euspondylus is endemic to northern South America.

Species
The following 10 species are recognized as being valid.
Euspondylus acutirostris (W. Peters, 1863) – sharp-snouted sun tegu
Euspondylus auyanensis Myers, G. Rivas & Jadin, 2009
Euspondylus caideni G. Köhler, 2003
Euspondylus excelsum Chavez, Catenazzi & Venegas, 2017
Euspondylus guentheri (O'Shaughnessy, 1881) – Günther's sun tegu
Euspondylus maculatus Tschudi, 1845 – spotted sun tegu
Euspondylus monsfumus Mijares-Urrutia, Señaris & Arends, 2001
Euspondylus nellycarrillae G. Köhler & Lehr, 2004
Euspondylus paxcorpus Doan & Adams, 2015 
Euspondylus simonsii Boulenger, 1901 – Simons' sun tegu

Nota bene: A binomial authority in parentheses indicates that the species was originally described in a genus other than Euspondylus.

References

Further reading
Boulenger GA (1885). Catalogue of the Lizards in the British Museum (Natural History). Second Edition. Volume II. ... Teiidæ .... London: Trustees of the British Museum (Natural History). (Taylor and Francis, printers). xiii + 497 pp. + Plates I-XXIV. (Genus Euspondylus, p. 404).
Tschudi JJ (1845). "Reptilium conspectus quae in Republica Peruana reperiuntur et pleraque observata vel collecta sunt in itenere ". Archiv für Naturgeschichte 11 (1): 150–170. (Euspondylus, new genus, pp. 160–161). (in Latin).

 
Lizard genera
Taxa named by Johann Jakob von Tschudi